Events from the year 1988 in the United Kingdom. The year saw the merger in March of the SDP and the Liberals to form the Liberal Democrats. There were also two notable disasters this year: the Piper Alpha oil rig explosion and the bombing of Pan Am Flight 103.

Incumbents
 Monarch – Elizabeth II
 Prime Minister – Margaret Thatcher (Conservative)
 Parliament – 50th

Events

January
 January – Elizabeth Butler-Sloss becomes the first woman to be appointed a Lord Justice of Appeal.
 3 January – Margaret Thatcher becomes the longest-serving UK Prime Minister this century, having been in power for eight years and 244 days.
 4 January – Sir Robin Butler replaces Sir Robert Armstrong as Cabinet Secretary, on the same day that Margaret Thatcher makes her first state visit to Africa when she arrives in Kenya.
 5 January – Actor Rowan Atkinson launches the new Comic Relief charity appeal.
 7 January – Labour Party leader Neil Kinnock calls for a further £1,300,000,000 to be made available for the National Health Service.
 8 January – The Society of Motor Manufacturers and Traders reveals that new car sales in Britain last year exceeded 2,000,000 for the first time. The Ford Escort was Britain's best-selling car for the sixth year running.
 11 January – The government announces that inflammable foam furniture will be banned from March next year.
 14 January – Unemployment figures are released for the end of 1987, showing the eighteenth-successive monthly decrease. Just over 2,600,000 people are now unemployed in the United Kingdom – the lowest figure for seven years. More than 500,000 of those unemployed, found jobs in 1987.
 22 January 
 Colin Pitchfork is sentenced to life imprisonment after admitting the rape and murder of two girls in Leicestershire in 1983 and 1986, the first conviction for murder in the UK based on DNA fingerprinting evidence.
 Peugeot's British-built 405 saloon, winner of the European Car of the Year award, goes on sale in Britain. A five-door estate model is due later this year.
 23 January – David Steel announces that he will not stand for the leadership of the new Social and Liberal Democratic Party.
 24 January – Arthur Scargill is re-elected as Leader of the National Union of Mineworkers by a narrow majority.
 28 January – The Birmingham Six lose an appeal against their convictions.

February
 1 February – Victor Miller, a 33-year-old warehouse worker from Wolverhampton, confesses to the murder of 14-year-old Stuart Gough, who was found dead in Worcestershire last month.
 3 February – Nurses throughout the UK strike for higher pay and more funding for the National Health Service.
 4 February – Nearly 7,000 ferry workers go on strike in Britain, paralysing the nation's seaports.
 5 February – The first BBC Red Nose Day raises £15,000,000 for charity.
 7 February – It is reported that more than 50% of men and 80% of women working full-time in London, are earning less than the lowest sum needed to buy the cheapest houses in the capital.
 9 February - Helen McCourt, a 22-year-old insurance clerk from Lancashire (now Merseyside) disappeared after getting off a bus less than 500 yards from her home in the village of Billinge. Her body was never found. 
 13 – 28 February – Great Britain and Northern Ireland compete at the Winter Olympics in Calgary, Alberta, Canada, but do not win any medals.
 15 February – Norman Fowler, Secretary of State for Employment, announces plans for a new training scheme which the government hopes will give jobs to up to 600,000 people who are currently unemployed.
 16 February – Thousands of nurses and co-workers form picket lines outside British hospitals as they go on strike in protest against what they see as inadequate NHS funding.
 26 February – Multiple rapist and murderer John Duffy is sentenced to life imprisonment with a recommendation that he should never be released.

March
 1 March – British Aerospace launches a takeover bid for the government-owned Rover Group, the largest British-owned carmaker.
 3 March – The SDP amalgamates with the Liberal Party to form the Social and Liberal Democratic Party. Its interim leaders are David Steel and Robert Maclennan. The merger means that the Liberal Party has ceased to exist after 129 years.
 4 March – Halifax Building Society reveals that year-on-year house prices rose by 16.9% last month.
 6 March – Operation Flavius: a Special Air Service team of the British Army shoots dead three unarmed members of a Provisional Irish Republican Army (IRA) Active Service Unit in Gibraltar.
 7 March – Margaret Thatcher announces a £3,000,000,000 regeneration scheme to improve a series of inner city areas by the year 2000.
 9 March – It is revealed that the average price of a house in Britain reached £60,000 at the end of last year, compared to £47,000 in December 1986.
 10 March – The Prince of Wales (now Charles III) narrowly avoids death in an avalanche while on a skiing holiday in Switzerland. Major Hugh Lindsay, former equerry to the Queen, is killed.
 11 March – The Bank of England £1 note ceases to be legal tender.
 15 March – In the 1988 budget, Chancellor Nigel Lawson announces that the standard rate of income tax will be cut to 25p in the pound, while the maximum rate of income tax will be cut to 40p from 60p in the pound.
 16 March – Milltown Cemetery attack: three men are killed and 70 are wounded by loyalist paramilitary Michael Stone at Milltown Cemetery in Belfast during the funerals of the three IRA members killed in Gibraltar.
 17 March – The fall in unemployment continues, with just over 2,500,000 people now registered as unemployed in the UK. However, there is a blow for the city of Dundee, when Ford Motor Company scraps plans to build a new electronics plant in the city – a move which ends hopes of 1,000 new jobs being created for this city which has high unemployment.
 19 March – Corporals killings in Belfast: British Army corporals Woods and Howes are abducted, beaten and shot dead by Irish republicans after driving into the funeral cortege of an IRA member killed in the Milltown Cemetery attack.
 29 March – Plans are unveiled for Europe's tallest skyscraper to be built at Canary Wharf. The office complex will cost around £3,000,000,000 to build, and is set to open in 1992.

April
 9 April – The house price boom is reported to have boosted wealth in London and the South-East by £39,000,000,000 over the last four years, compared with an £18,000,000,000 slump in Scotland and the North-West of England.
 10 April – Golfer Sandy Lyle becomes the first British winner of the US Masters.
 21 April – The government announces that nurses will receive a 15% pay rise, at a cost of £794,000,000 which will be funded by the Treasury.
 24 April – Luton Town FC beat Arsenal in the Littlewoods Cup final at Wembley 3–2. The match was won in the 92nd minute with a goal by Brian Stein after Luton had come back from being 2–1 down and goalkeeper Andy Dibble saving a penalty in the 79th minute. Luton scorers Brian Stein (2) and Danny Wilson. 96,000 fans were in attendance.

May
 May – The first group of sixteen-year-olds sit General Certificate of Secondary Education examinations, replacing both the O-level and CSE. The new qualifications are marked against objective standards rather than relatively.
 2 May – Three off-duty British servicemen are killed in the Netherlands by the IRA.
 6 May – Graeme Hick makes English cricket history by scoring 405 runs in a county championship match.
 7 May – The proposed Poll tax (referred to by the Government as the Community Charge), which is expected to come into force next year, will see the average house rise in value by around 20%, according to a study.
 14 May – Wimbledon F.C., who have been Football League members for just eleven seasons and First Division members for two, win the FA Cup with a 1–0 win over league champions Liverpool at Wembley. Lawrie Sanchez scored the winning goal in the first half, while Liverpool's John Aldridge missed a penalty in the second half. In Scotland, Celtic beat Dundee United 2–1 in the Scottish Cup final with two late goals from Frank McAvennie to complete the Scottish double.
 19 May
 Unemployment is now below 2,500,000 for the first time since early-1981.
 House prices in Norwich, one of the key beneficiaries of the current economic boom, have risen by 50% in the last year.
 24 May
 Local Government Act becomes law. The controversial Section 28 prevents local authorities from "promoting homosexuality". Local authorities are also obliged to outsource more services, and dog licences are abolished (except in Northern Ireland).
 Albert Dock in Liverpool reopened by Prince Charles (now Charles III) as a leisure and business centre including the Tate Liverpool art museum.
 31 May – The BBC controversial film, Tumbledown is broadcast despite Ministry of Defence concern

June
 2 June – U.S. President Ronald Reagan makes a visit to the UK.
 11 June – Some 80,000 people attend a concert at Wembley Stadium in honour of Nelson Mandela, the South African anti-apartheid campaigner who has been imprisoned since 1964.
 15 June – Six British soldiers are killed by the IRA in Lisburn.
 16 June – More than one hundred English football fans are arrested in West Germany in connection with incidents of football hooliganism during the European Championships.
 18 June – England's participation in the European Football Champions ended when they finished bottom of their group having lost all three games.
 21 June – The Poole explosion of 1988 causes 3,500 people to be evacuated from Poole town centre in the biggest peacetime evacuation in the United Kingdom since World War II.
 23 June – Three gay rights activists invade the BBC television studios during the six o'clock bulletin of the BBC News.

July
 July – The Freeze art exhibition is held at Surrey Docks in London Docklands. It is organised by Damien Hirst, and is considered significant in the development of the Young British Artists.
 5 July – The Church of England announces that it will allow the ordination of female priests from 1992.
 6 July
 Piper Alpha disaster; the Piper Alpha oil rig in the North Sea explodes and results in the death of 167 workers.
 A contractor's relief driver pours twenty tonnes of aluminium sulphate into the wrong tank at a water treatment plant near Camelford in Cornwall, causing extensive pollution to the local water supply.
 8 July – The final large stationary steam engine in use in a British factory, is shut down at a tannery in Otley.
 18 July – Paul Gascoigne, 21-year-old midfielder, becomes the first £2,000,000 footballer signed by a British club when he leaves Newcastle United and joins Tottenham Hotspur.
 28 July – Paddy Ashdown, MP for Yeovil in Somerset, is elected as the first Leader of the Social and Liberal Democratic Party.
 29 July – Most provisions of the Education Reform Act come into effect in England, Wales and Northern Ireland. The Act introduces Grant-maintained schools and Local Management of Schools, allowing schools to be taken out of the direct control of local government; a National Curriculum with Key Stages; an element of parental preference in the choice of schools; published league tables of school examination results; controls on the use of the word 'degree' by UK institutions; and abolition of tenure for new academics.
 31 July – Economists warn that the house price boom is likely to end next year.

August
 1 August – A soldier is killed and Inglis Barracks in London is damaged in a bombing.
 2 August – Everton F.C. pay £2,300,000 for West Ham United striker Tony Cottee, 22, breaking the national record set six weeks ago by Paul Gascoigne's transfer.
 8 August – The first child (a girl) of TRH The Duke and Duchess of York is born at Portland Hospital in London. She is fifth in line to the throne until the birth of Prince George on 22 July 2013 and later ninth in line.
 14 August – Scunthorpe United F.C.'s Glanford Park is opened; the first new stadium to be built by a Football League club since the 1950s. Their last game at their original ground, Old Showground, was on 18 May.
 18 August – Ian Rush becomes the most expensive player to join a British club when he returns to Liverpool F.C. for £2,700,000 after a year at Juventus in Italy.
 20 August – Ballygawley bus bombing: Six British soldiers are killed by an IRA bomb near Belfast; twenty-eight others are injured.
 22 August
 New licensing laws allow pubs to stay open all day in England and Wales.
 The Duke and Duchess of York's fourteen-day-old daughter is named Beatrice Elizabeth Mary.
 29 August – Fourteen-year-old Matthew Sadler becomes Britain's youngest international chess master.
 31 August – Postal workers walk out on strike over a dispute concerning bonuses paid to recruit new workers in London and the South East.

September
 3 September – Economic experts warn that the recent economic upturn for most of the developed world is almost over, and that these countries – including Britain – face a recession in the near future.
 9 September – The England cricket team's tour to India is cancelled after Captain Graham Gooch and seven other players are refused visas because of involvement in South African cricket during the apartheid boycott.
 10 September – Teenager Lee Boxell disappears in South London whilst out shopping with a friend and is never found.
 13 September – Royal Mail managers and Union of Communication Workers representatives agree a settlement to end the postal workers strike.
 17 September – Great Britain and Northern Ireland compete at the 1988 Summer Olympics in Seoul, South Korea, and win 5 gold, 10 silver and 9 bronze medals.
 19 September – Actor Roy Kinnear is seriously injured after falling off his horse during filming in Spain. He dies of his injuries the following day.
 20 September – Margaret Thatcher gives her "Bruges speech", opposing moves to transition the European Economic Community into a federal Europe.
 24 September – The house price boom is reported to be slowing as a result of increased mortgage rates.
 30 September – Operation Flavius: A Gibraltar jury decides that the IRA members killed in March were killed "lawfully".

October
 2 October – Great Britain and Northern Ireland finish competing in the Seoul Olympic Games, as the games come to a close.
 9 October – Labour MP and Shadow Chancellor John Smith, 50, is hospitalised due to a heart attack in Edinburgh.
 12 October – As Pope John Paul II addresses the European Parliament, Ian Paisley heckles and denounces him as the Antichrist.
 13 October – The House of Lords rules that extracts of the banned book Spycatcher can be published in the media.
 14 October – Vauxhall launches the third and final generation of its popular Cavalier hatchback and saloon which will be built by General Motors in European factories including the Luton plant and sold outside the UK as the Opel Vectra. A Cavalier-based coupe will be launched next year.
 18 October – Jaguar unveils its new Jaguar XJ220 supercar at the Motor Show. It is set to go into production in 1990, costing £350,000 and being the world's fastest production car with a top speed of 220mph.
 19 October – The United Kingdom bans broadcast interviews with IRA members. The BBC gets around this stricture through the use of professional actors.
 27 October – Three IRA supporters are found guilty of conspiracy to murder in connection with a plot to kill Secretary of State for Northern Ireland Tom King.
 28 October – British Rail announces a 21% increase in the cost of long distance season tickets.

November
 2 November – Victor Miller is sentenced to life imprisonment for the murder of 14-year-old Stuart Gough in Worcestershire earlier this year, with a recommendation by the trial judge that he is not considered for parole for at least thirty years.
 4 November – Margaret Thatcher presses for freedom for the people of Poland on her visit to Gdańsk.
 9 November – The government unveils plans for a new identity card scheme in an attempt to clamp down on football hooliganism.
 15 November
 The Education Secretary, Kenneth Baker, says that the national testing will place greater emphasis on grammar.
 Firearms (Amendment) Act 1988 prohibits civilian ownership of virtually all semi-automatic firearms from January 1989, in response to the Hungerford massacre of 1987.
 30 November
 A government report reveals that up to 50,000 people in Britain may be HIV positive, and that by the end of 1992, up to 17,000 people may have died from AIDS.
 A bronze statue of former Labour Prime Minister Clement Attlee (1883–1967) is unveiled outside Limehouse Library in London by another former Labour Prime Minister, Harold Wilson.

December
 3 December – Health Minister Edwina Currie provokes outrage by stating that most of Britain's egg production is infected with the salmonella bacteria, causing an immediate nationwide decrease in egg sales.
 6 December – The last shipbuilding facilities on Wearside, once the largest shipbuilding area in the world, are to close with the loss of 2,400 jobs.
 10 December – James W. Black wins the Nobel Prize in Physiology or Medicine jointly with Gertrude B. Elion and George H. Hitchings "for their discoveries of important principles for drug treatment".
 12 December – 35 people are killed in the Clapham Junction rail crash.
 15 December – Unemployment is now only just over 2,100,000 – the lowest level for almost eight years.
 16 December
 Edwina Currie resigns as Health Minister.
 M25 Three: a series of burglaries take place, and a man is murdered during the early hours around the M25 motorway.
 19 December
 The Royal Institution of Chartered Surveyors publishes its house price survey, revealing a deep recession in the housing market.
 PC Gavin Carlton, 29, is shot dead in Coventry in a siege by two armed bank robbers. His colleague DC Leonard Jakeman is also shot but survives. One of the gunmen gives himself up to police, while the other shoots himself dead.
 20 December – The three-month-old daughter of the Duke and Duchess of York is christened Beatrice Elizabeth Mary.
 21 December – Pan Am Flight 103 explodes over the town of Lockerbie, killing a total of 270 people – 11 on the ground and all 259 who were on board.

Undated
 Inflation remains low for the seventh year running, now standing at 4.9%.
 The Communist Party of Britain is founded by a Marxist–Leninist faction of the Communist Party of Great Britain after the latter's leadership embraces Eurocommunism.
 TAT-8, the first transatlantic telephone cable to use optical fibers, is completed, coming ashore in Cornwall.
 Diggers of the foundations of the new Art Gallery at the Guildhall in the City of London accidentally discover the remains of a Roman amphitheatre, now on public display.
York City Levy, living-history group is founded.

Publications
 17 May – Hello! magazine launched in the UK.
 Iain M. Banks' novel The Player of Games.
 Bruce Chatwin's novel Utz.
 Roald Dahl's children's novel Matilda
 Physicist Stephen Hawking's book A Brief History of Time.
 David Lodge's novel Nice Work.
 Terry Pratchett's Discworld novels Sourcery and Wyrd Sisters.

Births

 7 January – Alan Lowing, Scottish footballer
 10 January 
 Michael McIlorum, English rugby league footballer
 Rachel Williams, English footballer
 12 January – Chris Casement, Northern Irish footballer
 14 January 
 Kacey Clarke, actress
 Tom Rosenthal, actor and comedian
 18 January – Ironik, British musician, DJ and rapper
 19 January – Danny Haynes, English footballer
 24 January – Jade Ewen, singer with Sugababes, songwriter and actress
 26 January – Mia Rose, singer-songwriter
 13 February – Aston Merrygold, English singer in boy band JLS
 17 February – Adil Rashid, English cricketer
 18 February – The Blossom Twins, English twin professional wrestlers
 29 February – Hannah Mills, Welsh sports sailor
 2 March – James Arthur, singer-songwriter 
 4 March – Josh Bowman, English screen actor
 23 March – Jason Kenny, English track cyclist
 24 March – Finn Jones, English actor
 27 March 
 Holliday Grainger, actress
 Jessie J, singer-songwriter
 28 March – Lacey Turner, English actress
 1 April – Ed Drewett, English pop singer-songwriter
 6 April – Fabrice Muamba, Zaire-born English footballer
 14 April – Ben Lloyd-Hughes, actor
 21 April – Sophie Rundle, English actress
 23 April – Steph Houghton, English footballer
 26 April – S. E. Lister, novelist
 5 May – Adele, English recording artist and songwriter
 10 May – Adam Lallana, English footballer
 15 May – Marcus Collins, English singer
 17 May – Freddie Hogan, actor
 23 May – Gavin Free, English cinematographer
 5 June – Sam Slocombe, English footballer
 20 June – Shefali Chowdhury, British actress
 24 June – Micah Richards, English football player and pundit.
 25 June – Mark Haskins, English professional wrestler
 26 June – Samanda (Amanda and Samantha Marchant), British acting duo
 2 July – Edward Randell, English musician and actor
 4 July – Conor MacNeill, Northern Irish actor
 5 July – Joe Lycett, comedian and presenter
 7 July – Jack Whitehall, comedian 
 8 July – Shazad Latif, actor
 13 July – Tulisa, English recording artist
 15 July – Riki Christodoulou, English racing driver
 19 July – Joe Tracini, English actor and presenter
 23 July – Paul Anderson, English footballer
 27 July – Liam Smith, English boxer
 2 August – Chris Quick, Scottish editor and producer
 4 August – Tom Parker, English singer (d. 2022)
 8 August – Princess Beatrice, daughter of The Duke and Duchess of York
 12 August – Tyson Fury, world heavyweight boxing champion
 24 August – Rupert Grint, actor (Ron Weasley in the Harry Potter films)
 25 August
 Alexandra Burke, singer
 Ray Quinn, singer and actor
 31 August – Tom Hunt, politician
 6 September – Max George, singer
 15 September
Michael Cooper, rugby league player
Clare Maguire, singer-songwriter
 28 September –  Lee Collins, footballer (d. 2021)
 4 October – Ashley Banjo, choreographer
 12 October – Calum Scott, British singer-songwriter
 13 October – Stephen Flynn, Scottish politician
 25 October – Rylan Clark-Neal, born Ross Clark, television personality
 28 October – Edd Gould, flash animator and creator of Eddsworld (d. 2012)
 31 October
 Ben Bruce, guitarist and vocalist for Asking Alexandria
 Lizzy Yarnold, skeleton racer, most successful British Winter Olympian of all time
 7 November – Tinie Tempah (Patrick Okogwu), rapper
 12 November – Alistair Brammer, actor and singer
 15 November
 Ricky Norwood, English actor
Billy Twelvetrees, English rugby player
 20 November – Mz Bratt (Cleo Humphrey), electro/grime artist
 26 November – Tamsin Egerton, English actress and model
 28 November – Joe Cole, actor 
 2 December
 Alfred Enoch, actor
 Edward Windsor, Lord Downpatrick
 7 December – Benjamin Clementine, English-born singer-songwriter
 13 December – Paul Johnston, English cricketer
 15 December – Emily Head, English actress
 16 December – Anna Popplewell, English actress
 18 December – Lizzie Armitstead, racing cyclist
 27 December – Sarvi Kalhor, singer and recording artist
 28 December
 Ched Evans, Welsh footballer
 Elfyn Evans, Welsh rally driver
 Florrie, English pop singer
 30 December 
 Kirsty-Leigh Porter, English actress
 Leon Jackson, Scottish singer

Deaths
 1 January – Margot Bryant, actress (born 1897)
 2 January – E. B. Ford, geneticist (born 1901)
 6 January – L. P. Davies, novelist (born 1914)
 7 January – Trevor Howard, actor (born 1913)
 13 January – Donald Healey, rally driver, automobile engineer and speed record holder (born 1898)
 16 January – Ballard Berkeley, actor (born 1904)
 9 February - Helen McCourt, insurance clerk and murder victim (born 1965)
 11 February – Marion Crawford, Scottish nanny of Elizabeth II (born 1909)
 13 February – Léon Goossens, oboist (born 1897)
 22 February – Cecil Beresford Ramage, actor, politician and barrister (born 1895)
 27 February – Basil Boothroyd, humorous writer (born 1910)
 18 March – Percy Thrower, gardener and broadcaster (born 1913)
 5 April – Anthony Emery, Roman Catholic prelate (born 1918)
 6 April – John Clements, actor (born 1910)
 12 April – Harry McShane, socialist (born 1891)
 14 April – John Stonehouse, government minister noted for faking his own death (born 1925)
 15 April – Kenneth Williams, comic actor (born 1926)
 23 April – Michael Ramsey, Archbishop of Canterbury (born 1904)
 27 April – David Scarboro, actor (born 1968)
 28 April – Fenner Brockway, socialist politician and pacifist (born 1888 in British India)
 5 May – George Rose, actor (victim of assault) (born 1920)
 11 May – Kim Philby, spy (born 1912)
 16 May – Charles Keeping, illustrator (born 1924)
 18 May – Sir Brandon Rhys-Williams, Conservative Party MP (born 1927)
 5 June – Michael Barrington, actor (born 1924)
 8 June – Russell Harty, television presenter (born 1934)
 7 July – Jimmy Edwards, comedy actor (born 1920)
 11 July – Barbara Wootton, Baroness Wootton of Abinger, sociologist and life peer (born 1897)
 22 July – Patrick Newell, actor (born 1932)
 25 July – Douglas Hickox, film director (born 1929)
 1 August – Steve Mills, footballer (born 1953)
 8 August – Alan Napier, actor (born 1903)
 19 August – Frederick Ashton, choreographer (born 1904, Ecuador)
 27 August – William Sargant, psychiatrist (born 1907)
 11 September – Roger Hargreaves, children's author (born 1935)
 16 September – Dick Pym, footballer (born 1893)
 17 September – Nellie Beer, politician, Lord Mayor of Manchester (1966–67) (born 1900)
 20 September – Roy Kinnear, actor (born 1934) (fall from horse in Spain)
 1 October – Sir Sacheverell Sitwell, writer (born 1897)
 2 October – Sir Alec Issigonis, car designer (born 1906, Ottoman Empire)
 9 October – Jackie Milburn, footballer (born 1924)
 15 October – Kaikhosru Shapurji Sorabji, composer, music critic, pianist, and writer (born 1892)
 20 October – Sheila Scott, aviator (born 1927)
 27 October – Charles Hawtrey, actor (born 1914)
 6 November –  Donald Wade, Baron Wade, lawyer and politician (born 1904)
 9 November – Rosemary Timperley, author (born 1920)
 11 November – William Ifor Jones, Welsh composer (born 1900)
 10 December 
Johnny Lawrence, cricketer and coach (born 1911)
Dorothy de Rothschild, philanthropist and activist (born 1895)
 13 December – Roy Urquhart, major-general and World War II veteran (born 1901)
 26 December – John Loder, actor (born 1898)
 29 December – Sir Ieuan Maddock, nuclear scientist (born 1917)

See also
 1988 in British music
 1988 in British television
 List of British films of 1988

References

 
Years of the 20th century in the United Kingdom
United Kingdom